The 1954 NCAA baseball season, play of college baseball in the United States organized by the National Collegiate Athletic Association (NCAA) began in the spring of 1954.  The season progressed through the regular season and concluded with the 1954 College World Series.  The College World Series, held for the eighth time in 1954, consisted of one team from each of eight geographical districts and was held in Omaha, Nebraska at Johnny Rosenblatt Stadium as a double-elimination tournament.  Missouri claimed the championship.

Realignment
Seven teams (Clemson, Duke, Maryland, North Carolina, NC State, South Carolina, and Wake Forest) departed the Southern Conference.  They, together with Virginia, created the new Atlantic Coast Conference.  Both leagues adopted single division formats, instead of the SoCon's previous two division format.  Neither conference held a postseason tournament in 1954.

New program
Texas Tech restarted its program, having been dormant since 1929.  The Red Raiders played as an independent.

Conference winners
This is a partial list of conference champions from the 1954 season.  Each of the eight geographical districts chose, by various methods, the team that would represent them in the NCAA Tournament.  Twelve teams earned automatic bids by winning their conference championship, and eleven teams earned at-large selections.

Conference standings
The following is an incomplete list of conference standings:

College World Series

The 1954 season marked the eighth NCAA Baseball Tournament, which consisted of the eight team College World Series.  The College World Series was held in Omaha, Nebraska.  The eight teams played a double-elimination format, with Missouri claiming their first championship with a 7–5 win over Texas in the final.

Award winners

All-America team

References